Asamia is a genus of beetles in the family Buprestidae, containing the following species:

 Asamia insolita Thery, 1909
 Asamia pulcherrima (Obst, 1903)

References

Buprestidae genera